Cis or cis- may refer to:

Places 
 Cis, Trentino, in Italy
 In Poland:
 Cis, Świętokrzyskie Voivodeship, south-central 
 Cis, Warmian-Masurian Voivodeship, north

Math, science and biology 
 cis (mathematics) (cis(θ)), a trigonometric mathematical function related to Euler's formula
 Cis (beetle), genus 
 Cis–trans isomerism, in chemistry
 cis-regulatory element, regions of non-coding DNA which regulate the transcription of nearby genes

Other uses 
 Cisgender, in contrast with transgender
 C♯ (musical note), known as cis

See also 
 CIS (disambiguation)

 Ciss (disambiguation)
Csi (disambiguation)